Chentang, officially Zhêntang Town is a town in Dinggyê County, in the Shigatse prefecture-level city of the Tibet Autonomous Region of China. It is a border town on the China–Nepal border and lies on the Pum Qu River. At the time of the 2010 census, the town had a population of 2,043., it had 6 communities under its administration.

People
Most of the population of the vicinity are Sherpa people. Due to the fact that Sherpa is not one of the recognized ethnic minorities in China, they are classified as "Others" on their citizenship. However, Sherpa is stated as part of their household registration. The locals cultivate finger millet using terraces on the slopes for produce, which can be used to make Chhaang a popular local drink. Many of the families in valley have two homes — one for the growing season high up on the slopes, the other in the valley to shelter through the colder winter.

The Sherpas in the region are considered to be good dancers, with similarities to many ethnic groups in Nepal. Most of the locals practice Buddhism. There is an elementary school in the township. However, children would need to go to Dinggyê County for boarding middle school and Shigatse prefecture for boarding high school.

Border
The bordering Nepalese town is Kimathanka. The border was part of brief dispute between China and Nepal before 1960. The dispute was resolved in their 1961 border agreement. There is small scale local trade. The local cross-border trade has gotten so important in the recent decades that in 2008 when Chinese tightened its border control during the 2008 Summer Olympics, the bordering Nepalese towns faced food shortages due to disruption of local trade. A Chinese border checkpoint was set up in 2011 checking border crossing permits of Nepalese.

References 

Township-level divisions of Tibet
Populated places in Shigatse
China–Nepal border crossings